Gowai (Devanagari: गोवाई Gowaí) is a village in Morar block of Gwalior district, in Madhya Pradesh, India. As of 2011, the village population is 928, in 226 households.

History 
At the beginning of the 20th century, Gowai was part of Gwalior State. Located in the pargana and zila of Gird Gwalior, it had a population of 126 and an area of 2,074 bighas.

References 

Villages in Gwalior district